Bodilopsis is a genus of scarab beetles in the family Scarabaeidae. There are at least four described species in Bodilopsis, found in Europe and Asia.

Species
These four species belong to the genus Bodilopsis:
 Bodilopsis aquilus (Schmidt, 1916)
 Bodilopsis ogloblini (Semenov & Medvedev, 1928)
 Bodilopsis rufus (Moll, 1782)
 Bodilopsis sordidus (Fabricius, 1775)

References

Scarabaeidae
Scarabaeidae genera